Antiopic is an independent record label in Chicago, Illinois. It was started in New York City in 2002 by David Daniell and James Elliott.

Discography
 Need Thomas Windham: employment patterns (2002)
 David Daniell: sem (2002)
 Ultra-red: ¡Amnistía! (2003)
 Dion Workman: Ching (2003)
 Joyce Hinterding: Spectral (2003)
 Ateleia: Swimming Against the Moments (2004)
 Anthony Burr/Charles Curtis: Alvin Lucier (2005)

Live series
In 2004, Antiopic initiated a series of releases of live, improvised performances, titled the Live Series. The Live Series releases are packaged as 3" CDs in cardboard sleeves.

 Carlos Giffoni/Lee Ranaldo/Jim O'Rourke: North Six (2004)
 Sakada (Mattin/Eddie Prévost/Mark Wastell/Margarida Garcia/Rhodri Davies): Never Give Up on the Margins of Logic (2004)
 Tetuzi Akiyama/Oren Ambarchi/Alan Licht: Willow Weep and Moan for Me (2006)

Allegorical Power series
From June through December 2003, Antiopic published a monthly series of MP3 releases online via the Antiopic website titled the Allegorical Power Series. According to the Antiopic website, "this series was meant to address the possibilities and roles of abstract or experimental music as social and political response; it attempted to provide a forum and space for artists to present new work as protest and as an exploration of the meaning and potential of sound art in the context of and as response to global injustice."

Volume I: June 2003
William Basinski
TV Pow
Ateleia
Zbigniew Karkowski
Need Thomas Windham
Dion Workman/Michael Haleta
Nicedisc

Volume II: July 2003
With an essay by Jena Jolissaint
AGF
Project Qua Project
Sylvain Chauveau
Mattin
Ultra-red
Johnny Sinewave
PowerBooks for Peace
Luxury Estates
Jon Philpot

Volume III: August 2003
Curated and with an essay by Dion Workman
Okkyung Lee
Raz Mesinai
Rosy Parlane
Toshio Kajiwara
Julien Ottavi
Tim Barnes / David Daniell

Volume IV: September 2003
Alejandra and Aeron
Marina Rosenfeld
Mark Wastell and Graham Halliwell
o.blaat
Christopher DeLaurenti
Tu m'
psi
Ateleia
John Hudak

Volume V: October 2003
Osso Bucco
Stern / Guerra
j. frede
Nishide Takehiro
omnid
Freiband
Margarida Garcia
Unstable Ensemble

Volume VI: November 2003
We're Breaking Up
Lovely Midget
Presocratics
duul drv
Julien Ottavi and Dion Workman
Desist

Volume VII: December 2003
With an essay by Matthew Hyland.
Kaffe Matthews
Steinbrüchel
Anthony Pateras and Robin Fox
Blevin Blectum
The Debt
Ateleia and David Daniell
erikm
Barry Weisblat
Annette Krebs
Loren Connors
Sinistri
Andrew Burnes
Alessandro Bosetti
Anna Ghallo / Ryan Smith / Chuck Bettis
C.Rosenau / J.Schoenecker / J.Warchol

See also
 List of record labels

External links
 Official site

References

American independent record labels
Record labels established in 2002
Experimental music record labels
Electronic music record labels
2002 establishments in New York City